Paratlepolemoides spiniscapus is a species of beetle in the family Cerambycidae, and the only species in the genus Paratlepolemoides. It was described by Hunt and Breuning in 1959.

References

Crossotini
Beetles described in 1959
Monotypic beetle genera